Choreutis niphocrypta is a moth in the family Choreutidae. It was described by Edward Meyrick in 1930. It is found on New Guinea.

References

Choreutis
Moths described in 1930